The Raoul Wallenberg Committee of the United States was created in May 1981 to "perpetuate the humanitarian ideals and the nonviolent courage of Raoul Wallenberg".

It bestows the Raoul Wallenberg Awards on individuals, organizations and communities that reflect Wallenberg's "humanitarian spirit, personal courage and nonviolent action in the face of enormous odds". As at 2013, the current chairman and CEO is Rachel Oestreicher Bernheim, a position that she has held since at least 1995.

Accomplishments
Funded five Raoul Wallenberg International Human Rights Fellowships and a Swedish Fulbright Fellowship.
Published A Hero for Our Time and Raoul Wallenberg's Children.
Houses the Wallenberg research center. 
Circulates an exhibit, A Tribute to Raouls Walleberg, throughout the United States.
Lobbied to add Raoul Wallenberg's name to the official list of American POW's.
Sponsored the renaming of the sidewalk fronting the United Nations as "Raoul Wallenberg Walk".
In 1985 the committee began work for the issuance of a United States postal stamp to honor Wallenberg. The stamp was issued in 1997.
Established October 5, 1989 as Raoul Wallenberg Recognition Day by a Congressional Resolution.

Awards
 Raoul Wallenberg Award
 The Raoul Wallenberg A Hero For Our Time Award
 The Raoul Wallenberg Civic Courage Award

Honorary Chairmen
Per Anger
Guy von Dardel
Nina Lagergren
Krister Stendahl
Simon Wiesenthal

References

External links
 Official website
 Wallenberg biography
 Wallenberg case chronology

Humanitarian and service awards
Organizations established in 1981
Human rights organizations based in the United States
Raoul Wallenberg